The Police Tactical Unit (PTU) is a paramilitary specialist unit of the Singapore Police Force and comes under the direct command of the Special Operations Command. Based in Queenstown, it is the main anti-rioting and disaster-management unit of the police force. They are also called upon to handle cases of serious crime in progress, particularly cases involving firearms. From 2004, PTU officers also presented greater public prominence when they conducted patrols in public areas, such as at Orchard Road, Holland Village and Serangoon Gardens Estate, partly as a response to greater terrorism concerns.

History

Early Days

The PTU traces its history back to the early 1950s whereby the Maria Hertogh riots demonstrated the incapability of existing law enforcement measures in containing situations of mass rioting and other disturbances to public peace. Hence in 1952, the first Riot Squad was formed with 60 junior officers deliberately chosen from a wide range of ethnic backgrounds, and who have been screened to ensure no relations to any political party or faction. These officers underwent rigorous (military) training conducted by Colonel J.F. Fairbairn, who was formerly the Assistant Commissioner of the Shanghai Municipal Police Armed Reserve.

These officers formed the first riot control squad which became operational in December 1952 as the Reserve Unit (RU). Their responsibilities included crowd control, riot control, and provision of assistance during natural calamities such as fires and floods, thus three specially-trained squads were formed.

In 1953, the squad was reorganised into 3 troops of 50 men each, and renamed as the Police Reserve Unit (PRU), with PRU 1 stationed at Mount Vernon Camp, PRU 2 at Queensway Base and PRU 3 at Jalan Bahar Camp. The unit would later come to be known as the Police Task Force (PTF) following the merger of all three Reserved Units and permanently based at Queensway Base.

Modern Times

In response to an increasingly complicated and multi-faceted public safety and security requirements in contemporary environments, the PTF underwent another major review in 2003, this time with upgraded weaponry and vehicles, a change to their tactical uniforms in 2005, and the renaming of the unit as the Police Tactical Unit (PTU).

Wong Kan Seng, Deputy Prime Minister and Home Affairs Minister, oversaw the acquisition of the PETRA (Patrol, Escort, Tactical Response Van) vehicles alongside Police Tactical Squad (PTS) and Troop Tactical Vehicle (TTV) vans for the use of the PTU alongside the rest of the SOC in 2006 just in time for the IMF World Bank Summit in Singapore. The first two vans resemble Ford Transit Vans.

The unit is currently conducting counter-terrorist duties such as security duties in order to deter terrorist threats in Singapore alongside other police units.

The PTU also has a few sub-units; Armed Strike Teams and its National Servicemen unit called Public Order Troops that was formed on September 2018. The POT, once fully implemented in 2023, will work alongside its regular counterparts in major events such as riots, national emergencies, and public order incidents, as well as possible terrorist attacks.

Incidents

In the early morning of 25 April 1978, Constable Lee Kim Lai was abducted while he was performing sentry duties at the PRU 1 base at Mount Vernon, and found stabbed to death in a taxi later.
On 17 May 1978, SGT Toh Say Tin from the PRU 1 was on special duties when he slipped and fell overboard while attempting to board a boat from marine police speedboat PA 6 off Marine Parade. A non-swimmer, he was not wearing a life vest, and was swept away by the currents. His body was found on 19 May 1978 about eight kilometres from the incident.

Uniforms and Equipment

The Police Tactical Unit officers have traditionally worn the Combat Dress, also known as the no. 4 police uniform. This consists of a blue beret, long-sleeved blue polyester shirt with concealed plastic buttons, black combat belt, blue combat trousers, and black combat boots. The sleeves may be folded up during the day, and rolled down at dusk or during tactical training and operations.

In 2005, the uniform underwent a major review, and a new tactical uniform was introduced. The red beret was introduced to facilitate ease of spotting PTU officers in the event of a major crowd control incident. The combat uniform was also redesigned to a more loose-fitting attire with utility pockets, and the material changed to a cotton-polyester mix which is more durable and fire resistant. The colour of the uniform is also changed to a darker shade of blue for tactical purposes. High-heel boots with garters were also introduced.

The PTU officers are equipped with a variegated arsenal of weapons, such as riot gears, pepper spray, batons, the Heckler & Koch HK69A1 tear gas launcher, the Heckler & Koch USP semi-auto pistol and the Heckler and Koch MP5 sub-machine gun.

Firearms list 

 CZ P-07
 H&K USP
 H&K MP5
 FN SCAR
 H&K HK69A1
 Pepperball VKS

References

External links
Singapore Police Force Special Operations Command
PTU Singapore info and pictures

Special Operations Command (Singapore)
Non-military counterterrorist organizations